Bradyrhizobium arachidis is a species of legume-root nodulating, microsymbiotic nitrogen-fixing bacterium. It was first isolated from Arachis hypogaea root nodules in China. Its type strain is CCBAU 051107T (=CGMCC 1.12100T = HAMBI 3281T = LMG 26795T).

References

Further reading

External links
LPSN

Nitrobacteraceae
Bacteria described in 2013